USS Skylark (AM-63) was an   built for the United States Navy during World War II. She earned three battle stars during World War II. Skylark was mined and sunk off Okinawa in April 1945. She was struck from the Naval Vessel Register the same day.

Career 
Skylark was laid down on 9 July 1941 by the General Engineering & Dry Dock Company of Alameda, California; launched on 12 March 1942; sponsored by Mrs. William L. Simpson; and commissioned on 25 November 1942.

After almost a month of trials, calibrations, and training along the coast of California, Skylark got underway for Pearl Harbor, Hawaii, on the morning of 20 December. The convoy arrived in Pearl Harbor ten days later, and Skylark remained in the Islands for another eleven days. On 10 January 1943, she stood out of Pearl Harbor and set course for Espiritu Santo in the New Hebrides, escorting another convoy. For the next year, Skylark escorted convoys around the various island groups in the South Pacific, the New Hebrides, Samoa, New Caledonia, and the Solomons, the conquest of which she was supporting. Often she shepherded supply echelons to Guadalcanal and to some of the other islands in the group, then would patrol the area for a week or two.

Guadalcanal
Of all the months of that year, June 1943 was her most active. On the 16th, while she was screening ships off Guadalcanal, she came under aerial attack by Japanese dive bombers and assisted in splashing four of the intruders. Skylark succeeded in rescuing 193 survivors and carried them on to Espiritu Santo.

Solomons
In January 1944, the minesweeper began an extended period of convoy-escort and patrol duty in the Solomons. Until 15 April, her theater of operations was restricted to those islands alone as she herded the supply echelons between them. On 15 April, she departed the Solomons for Espiritu Santo, arriving there the next day. On 7 May, she began her return voyage to the Solomons; and, two days later, she put into Purvis Bay, Florida Island, for repairs. Repairs and minesweeping exercises occupied her time until 3 June, when she sailed from Purvis Bay with elements of Task Force 53, bound for Kwajalein Atoll in the Marshalls. The various elements of the task force rendezvoused at Kwajalein on the 8th, refueled, and departed on the 12th.

Marianas and Marshall Islands
The Southern Attack Force, otherwise known as task force TF 53, was assigned the job of retaking Guam during the Marianas operation. Originally, the Guam assault was to have come several days after that upon Saipan. However, the necessity of meeting and defeating the Japanese fleet in what was to be the Battle of the Philippine Sea and the determination that additional troops would be needed to conquer Guam caused the assault to be delayed. Skylark arrived in Eniwetok Lagoon three days later.

She remained at Eniwetok until 17 July at which time the task force departed for Guam. Arriving off Apra Harbor on 21 July, Skylark took up her screening station and, for almost two months, screened ships and patrolled in the vicinity of Apra. On 9 September, Skylark ceased patrolling and screening and departed Guam in the escort of an Eniwetok-bound convoy. She arrived on 14 September and entered an availability period until 3 October. From Eniwetok, she moved to Ulithi, arriving on 9 October and departing again on 17 September to escort the repair ship  back to Eniwetok. The two ships made Eniwetok on 23 October, and Skylark departed the next day. After a two-day layover at Majuro, 26 to 28 October, she headed for Pearl Harbor. From Pearl Harbor, she continued on to California, where she underwent repairs at both the Stockton Ship Works at Stockton, California, and General Engineering & Dry Dock Co., at Alameda, California.

Okinawa
On 15 February 1945, Skylark pointed her bow westward again and sailed out of Alameda. She entered Pearl Harbor on 22 February, provisioned the next day, and headed back to Eniwetok on 24 February. A month later, Skylark was with the other minesweepers clearing the invasion areas around Okinawa.

Mine damage
At 10:55 on 28 March, while sweeping a minefield off the Hagushi beaches, she struck a mine on her port side amidships. Skylark drifted while the crew fought fires and tried to save her. Twenty minutes later, she struck a second mine, took a heavy list, and sank within fifteen minutes. Five men were killed by the two explosions and, thanks to the rescue work of the destroyer minelayer , these were her only losses.

Skylark was struck from the Navy list on 28 April 1945. Skylark earned three battle stars for World War II service.

References

External links 
 Ships of the U.S. Navy, 1940-1945 - AM-63 USS Skylark
 uboat.net - Discussion Forums : Warship forum : info about USS Skylark
 Casualties: U.S. Navy and Coast Guard Vessels, Sunk or Damaged Beyond Repair during World War II, 7 December 1941-1 October 1945 
 Howard C. MacKnight
 Skylark (AM-63) 
 Photo gallery at navsource.org

 

Auk-class minesweepers of the United States Navy
Ships built in Alameda, California
1942 ships
World War II minesweepers of the United States
Ships sunk by mines
World War II shipwrecks in the Philippine Sea
Maritime incidents in March 1945